Nationalmuseum (or National Museum of Fine Arts) is the national gallery of Sweden, located on the peninsula Blasieholmen in central Stockholm.

The museum's operations stretches far beyond the borders of Blasieholmen, the nationalmuseum manage the National Portrait gallery collection at Gripshom, Gustavsbergporclain museum, a handful of castle collections and the Swedish Institute in Paris (Institut Tessin). In the summer of 2018 Nationalmuseum Jamtli opened in Östersund as a way to show a part of the collection in the north of Sweden.

The museum's benefactors include King Gustav III and Carl Gustaf Tessin. The museum was founded in 1792 as Kungliga Museet ("Royal Museum"). The present building was opened in 1866, when it was renamed the Nationalmuseum, and used as one of the buildings to hold the 1866 General Industrial Exposition of Stockholm.

The current building, built between 1844 and 1866, was inspired by North Italian Renaissance architecture. It is the design of the German architect Friedrich August Stüler, who also designed the Neues Museum in Berlin. The relatively closed exterior, gives no hint of the spacious interior dominated by the huge flight of stairs leading up to the topmost galleries.

The museum was enlarged in 1961 to accommodate the museum workshops. The present restaurant was instated in 1996. The museum building closed for renovation in 2013 and reopened on 13 October 2018. The $132 million overhaul sought to put more of the museum’s collection on display and to match the security, accessibility, fire safety and climate control of a modern institution.

History

The museum’s early history 

As with several other European national galleries, the history of the Nationalmuseum is largely synonymous with the development from royally to state-owned, and by extension publicly available collections. In Sweden, the foundation was laid for today's state art collections in the 18th century. Several of the works included in the Nationalmuseum collection of, for example, 18th-century French paintings were once owned by Queen Lovisa Ulrika. In 1777, the Queen's financial situation became unsustainable, in part as a result of large-scale and costly collecting. The debts were settled by her son, Sweden's then King Gustav III, in exchange for her renouncing her collections and also Drottningholm palace.

The building 

The project with a new Royal Museum in Stockholm was one of the largest and most lavish construction works of all time, which would take twelve years to complete and another three years to complete the interior work. The German architect Friedrich August Stüler was responsible for the design of the building and the Swedish architect Fredrik Wilhelm Scholander was responsible for the interior design. The building was inaugurated in 1866 at the same time as the Stockholm Exhibition in 1866. The Nationalmuseum has been a state building monument since 1935. The building is owned and managed by the National Property Board of Sweden.

Collection 

The museum collection consists of about half a million drawings from the Middle Ages to 1900, a prominent 17th-century collection of Rembrandt and other Dutch painters, and a collection of porcelain items, paintings, sculptures, and modern art as well. In total the collection amounts to circa 700,000 objects. The museum also has an art library, open to the public and academics.

Nationalmuseum holds the largest collection of portrait miniatures in the world, with more than 5 200 works. The collection features miniatures from many European school's, including works by Nicholas Hilliard, Isaac Oliver, Louis-Marie Autissier among others. A significant portion of works derives from the master collector Carl Fredrik Dahlgren, while the more exclusive works were donated by Hjalmar Wicander, a cork factory owner.  Production of bottle corks for the brewery industry provided the basis of his fortune. Wicander also donated funds specifically for additional purchases of miniatures.

Notable works

Drawings 

The collection of drawings contain c. 500,000 sheets, spanning from the late medieval period to about the year 1900. The core being more than 2 000 old master drawings collected by  Carl Gustaf Tessin. The sheets were acquired at the important sale of the court banker Pierre Crozat in the summer of 1741. Tessin was one of fourteen collectors who bought at bargain prices. Because of financial reasons the collection had to be sold to king Adolf Fredrik.

"The new Nationalmuseum" 

On the 3 of February 2013 the Nationalmuseum closed in preparation for renovation. The museum was in need of an extensive renovation and refurbishment as the building was worn by intensive use. In 2009, National Property Board of Sweden (SFV) was commissioned to carry out a feasibility study and in 2010 SFV was commissioned to produce a building program that was presented to the government in 2011. In 2012, planning began for renovation and rebuilding of the Nationalmuseum and in February 2013 the Nationalmuseum began its evacuation of the museum building.

One year later, on 20 February 2014, SFV was commissioned by the government to carry out renovation and conversion of the Nationalmuseum into a fully modern museum building, adapted to future museum operations with retained cultural-historical values ​​in the unique, listed building. The work took place in close collaboration with the tenant Nationalmuseum.

During the renovation, the museum building itself on Blasieholmen was closed to the public. During the time when the museum building was closed, the Nationalmuseum continued to show its art collection in other places in Stockholm, Sweden and abroad.

The museum was reinaugurated on 13 October 2018 by King Carl XVI Gustaf in the presence of parts of the royal family, Minister of Culture Alice Bah Kuhnke and thousands of visitors . The museum's exhibition space has been expanded and can now receive twice as many visitors and display almost three times as many works. In addition to a technical update, previously clogged windows and ceiling lanterns have been taken up to create more daylight and views of the city. The noisy restaurant has been given a better, quieter location and replaced with an airy and quiet sculpture courtyard. The museum has regained a rich color scheme inspired by the original colour palette.

See also 
 List of museums in Stockholm
 List of national galleries
 Hallwyl Palace
 Swedish Museum of National Antiquities

References

External links
National Museum of Fine Arts
Virtual tour of the Nationalmuseum provided by Google Arts & Culture

 
Infrastructure completed in 1866
Art museums established in 1792
Art museums and galleries in Stockholm
National museums of Sweden
1792 establishments in Sweden
World's fair architecture in Stockholm
Sweden